Hasan Teymur (also Romanized as Ḩasan Teymūr and Hasan Teimoor; also known as Hasan Temur) is a village in Ali Sadr Rural District, Gol Tappeh District, Kabudarahang County, Hamadan Province, Iran. At the 2006 census, its population was 154, in 39 families.

References 

Populated places in Kabudarahang County